Jerzy Kruszelnicki competed for Poland in the men's standing volleyball events at the 1988 Summer Paralympics (bronze medal), the 1992 Summer Paralympics (silver medal), the 1996 Summer Paralympics (bronze medal), and the 2000 Summer Paralympics.

See also 
 Poland at the 1988 Summer Paralympics
 Poland at the 1992 Summer Paralympics
 Poland at the 1996 Summer Paralympics
 Poland at the 2000 Summer Paralympics

References 

Living people
Year of birth missing (living people)
Place of birth missing (living people)
Polish men's volleyball players
Paralympic silver medalists for Poland
Paralympic bronze medalists for Poland
Paralympic medalists in volleyball
Volleyball players at the 1988 Summer Paralympics
Volleyball players at the 1992 Summer Paralympics
Volleyball players at the 1996 Summer Paralympics
Volleyball players at the 2000 Summer Paralympics
Medalists at the 1988 Summer Paralympics
Medalists at the 1992 Summer Paralympics
Medalists at the 1996 Summer Paralympics
20th-century Polish people
21st-century Polish people
Paralympic volleyball players of Poland